Catholic Church Insurance Association (CCIA) was established in 1975 by the Bishops’ Conferences of England and Wales, and Scotland, to provide insurance for Roman Catholic dioceses; religious orders; schools; care homes and other Catholic organisations. CCIA is accountable to the Bishops’ Conferences and endeavours to maintain business practices consistent with the ethos of the Church.

Through CCIA, Catholic organisations access Catholic National Mutual Ltd.(CNM), the Catholic Church's own insurance company and primary insurer within the CCIA scheme. CNM, based in Guernsey, is a mutual wholly owned by its clients with any profit used for the benefit of its members.

In 1996 CCIA and CNM received criticism from BBC Radio Scotland for their part in the Church's handling of abuse compensation claims.

Following the hearings into the Archdiocese of Birmingham at IICSA, the Independent Inquiry into Child Sexual Abuse, Stephen Parsons wrote on an influential blog

Had Stephen Parsons bothered to check, however, he would have discovered that the Archdiocese of Birmingham is not now nor has it ever been insured through the Catholic National Mutual.  He would also have discovered that, far from secretive, the Catholic National Mutual is an insurance company wholly owned by many of the dioceses of Scotland, England and Wales and several religious orders, regulated by the Guernsey Financial Services Commission, with its details listed on the GFSC's website. Full details are also available on the website at https://catholicinsuranceservice.co.uk/about-us/. Furthermore, he would be aware that since the Company is wholly owned by elements of the Church that are registered charities, the so-called tax haven status of Guernsey (where, in any event, the applicable tax rate is no lower than in the UK) would make no difference since the company would not be liable to tax on its underwriting profits in the UK in any event. It is based in Guernsey for historic reasons and, indeed, Guernsey is part of territory of one of the English Dioceses (Portsmouth).  Finally, he should be aware that, so far as the Public Liability insurances are concerned, these are underwritten (and therefore the strings are pulled) by Zurich and not by the CNM which merely acts as a backstop to the Zurich cover.   Nevertheless, rather than check, do some research and write accurately, Stephen Parsons would rather write poorly researched and misleading blog posts which are little more than false insinuations constructed on the "throw enough mud and some of it will stick" principle.

References

Financial services companies established in 1975
Insurance companies of the United Kingdom
Organizations established in 1975
Catholic Church in England and Wales
Catholic Church in Scotland